The women's road race T1-2 cycling event at the 2020 Summer Paralympics took place on 2 September 2021, at the Fuji Speedway in Shizuoka Prefecture. 11 riders competed in the event.

The T1–2 classification is for cyclists who have an impairment which affects their balance. They compete with a three-wheeled cycle called a tricycle - three wheels providing more balance than a standard two-wheeled cycle.

Results
The event took place on 2 September 2021 at 13:05.

References

Women's road race T1-2